The Rigby Group is the parent company of several privately owned businesses operating across Europe, the Middle East and North Africa.
In 2013 the company was ranked 13th in the Sunday Times’ Top Track 100 listing of the UK’s fastest growing private enterprises.

Activities
Rigby Group has six key divisions: Technology (Peter Rigby founded SCC, Specialist Computer Centres, in 1975), Airports, Real Estate, Finance, Hotels, and Aviation.

Allect is an international design group. It is the stable for Rigby Group’s design and delivery business. The Allect design group comprises founding member Rigby & Rigby, Helen Green Design (acquired in 2017), and Lawson Robb (acquired in 2018).

References

Companies based in Birmingham, West Midlands